Edgar Jose Ramos (born May 6, 1975) is a Venezuelan former professional baseball pitcher. Ramos played for the Philadelphia Phillies of Major League Baseball (MLB). He threw and batted right-handed.

In Ramos' 4 games at the MLB level, he posted a 0–2 record with four strikeouts and a 5.14 earned run average (ERA), in 14 innings pitched.

Ramos was signed as an undrafted free agent on February 3, 1992, by the Houston Astros. He was selected by the Phillies in the Rule 5 draft, on December 9, 1996; Ramos was returned to the Astros.

Ramos continued in Minor League Baseball (MiLB) through the 2001 season and made a brief comeback attempt in the Venezuelan Professional Baseball League (VPBL) in Winter, 2006–2007.

See also
 List of players from Venezuela in Major League Baseball

References

External links

Edgar Ramos at Pura Pelota (Venezuelan Professional Baseball League)

1975 births
Living people
Clearwater Phillies players
Guerreros de Oaxaca players
Gulf Coast Astros players
Jackson Generals (Texas League) players
Kissimmee Cobras players
Long Island Ducks players
Major League Baseball pitchers
Major League Baseball players from Venezuela
Mexican League baseball pitchers
Minor league baseball coaches
Nashua Pride players
Navegantes del Magallanes players
New Orleans Zephyrs players
Pastora de los Llanos players
People from Cumaná
Philadelphia Phillies players
Quad Cities River Bandits players
Tigres de Aragua players
Venezuelan baseball coaches
Venezuelan expatriate baseball players in Mexico
Venezuelan expatriate baseball players in the United States